Cosmosoma elegans is a species of moth of the family Erebidae. It was described by Arthur Gardiner Butler in 1876. It is found in Espírito Santo, Brazil.

References

elegans
Moths described in 1876